Tiny Shoulders: Rethinking Barbie is an American documentary film that premiered on April 27, 2018 on Hulu. Directed, written, and produced by Andrea Blaugrund Nevins, it explores the creation of the Barbie doll, the effect it has had on culture, and its evolution over the decades. For years, Barbie for some can spark unrealistic expectations for younger girls and even cause body image issues. According to Time, this petite, tall and curvy doll known as Barbie, constitutes as a major figure of the feminist movement and symbolizes male oppression. She has sparked debate and controversy for a variety of reasons which this documentary aims to capture.

Premise
Tiny Shoulders: Rethinking Barbie takes "a retrospective look at the doll’s unexpected origins and what she represents today — part fashion icon, part lightning rod. It included interviews with Gloria Steinem, Roxane Gay, Peggy Orenstein, Mattel insiders, cultural historians, and others and feature newly discovered footage and unprecedented access to the inner workings of Mattel during Barbie’s biggest reinvention."

Production

Development
On July 27, 2017, it was announced at the annual Television Critics Association summer press tour that Hulu had greenlit a feature documentary from Andrea Blaugrund Nevins and her production company Rare Bird Films. Nevins is producing alongside Cristan Crocker and the film is expected to include interviews with people such as Gloria Steinem, Roxane Gay, Peggy Orenstein.

Release

Marketing
On April 5, 2018, Hulu released the first trailer for the film.

Premiere
On April 25, 2018, the film held its world premiere during the annual Tribeca Film Festival at the Festival Hub at Spring Studios in New York City. Its premiere was part of the festival's "Spotlight Documentary" series of films that were being screened.

Distribution
On May 9, 2018, it was announced that Entertainment One had secured international distribution rights for the film.

Reception
Tiny Shoulders: Rethinking Barbie has been met with a positive response from critics.  On the review aggregation website Rotten Tomatoes, the film holds  approval rating with an average rating of  based on  reviews. The site's critical consensus reads, "A thoughtful rumination on beauty standards and feminism, Tiny Shoulders goes beyond plastic observations to create an even-handed examination of Barbie's role in the broader culture."

See also
List of original programs distributed by Hulu
United States in the 1950s
Barbie Liberation Organization

References

External links

Official trailer

2018 documentary films
American documentary films
Films directed by Andrea Blaugrund Nevins
Hulu original films
Films about Barbie
2010s English-language films
2010s American films